Benge may refer to:

 Benge, an African tribal ritual
 Benge, Democratic Republic of the Congo, a village in Bas-Uele Province
 Benge dialect of the Bwa language
 Benge, Washington, an unincorporated community in Adams County, Washington, USA
 Benge (musician), pseudonym of Ben Edwards, British musician and producer
 Benge (surname), a list of people with the surname Benge